Stewart Gemmell McKnight (9 January 1935 – 8 January 2021) was a New Zealand cricketer. He played seven first-class matches for Otago between 1958 and 1967.

McKnight grew up on the family property at Ranfurly, where his father died in 1940 while mining for gold.

As well as playing first-class cricket for Otago, McKnight played Hawke Cup cricket for Central Otago from 1963 to 1976. He captained Central Otago against the touring Marylebone Cricket Club in 1960–61 at Alexandra, top-scoring with 48 in the second innings. He took part in a world tour with a New Zealand Cricket Council side in 1964, playing in 11 countries. His son Ken also played first-class cricket for Otago.

McKnight was also a rugby union referee, and represented New Zealand at curling.

See also
 List of Otago representative cricketers

References

1935 births
2021 deaths
New Zealand cricketers
Otago cricketers
New Zealand male curlers
People from Ranfurly, New Zealand
20th-century New Zealand people